The 1980 NHL Entry Draft was the 18th NHL Entry Draft. It was held at the Montreal Forum. This was the first time that an NHL arena hosted the draft. The National Hockey League (NHL) teams selected 210 players eligible for entry into professional ranks, in the reverse order of the 1979–80 NHL season and playoff standings. This is the list of those players selected.  The minimum draft age was lowered from 19 to 18, but prospective draftees had to be of age by September 15 rather than any date in the relevant birth year.

It was the first time the Forum hosted the draft. The hometown Montreal Canadiens used the first selection on Doug Wickenheiser.

The last active players in the NHL from this draft class were Paul Coffey and Larry Murphy, who both retired after the 2000–01 season.

Selections by round
Below are listed the selections in the 1980 NHL Entry Draft.

Club teams are located in North America unless otherwise noted.

Round one

Notes
 The Colorado Rockies' first round pick went to the Montreal Canadiens as the result of a trade on September 13, 1976 that sent Ron Andruff, Sean Shanahan and the 19th overall pick to Colorado in exchange for this pick.
 The Quebec Nordiques' first round pick went to the Chicago Black Hawks as the result of a trade on June 9, 1979 that Black Hawks promised to not take Real Cloutier in 1979 NHL Expansion Draft in exchange for this pick.
 The Detroit Red Wings' first round pick went to the Los Angeles Kings as the result of to a trade on August 22, 1979, that sent rights to Dale McCourt to Detroit in exchange for Andre St. Laurent, Kings' option or Detroit's second round pick in 1980 or first round pick in 1981 and this pick.
 The Toronto Maple Leafs' first round pick went to the Detroit Red Wings as the result of to a trade on March 13, 1978 that sent Dan Maloney and the 25th overall pick to Toronto in exchange for Errol Thompson, a first and second round pick in 1978 and this pick.
 The Montreal Canadiens' first round pick went to the Colorado Rockies as the result of to a trade on September 13, 1976, that sent 1st overall pick to Montreal in exchange for Ron Andruff, Sean Shanahan and this pick.

Round two

Notes
 The Detroit Red Wings' second round pick went to the Toronto Maple Leafs as the result of a trade on March 13, 1978, that sent Errol Thompson, a first and second round pick in 1978 and the 11th overall pick to Detroit in exchange for Dan Maloney and this pick.
 The Washington Capitals' second round pick went to the Toronto Maple Leafs as the result of a trade on June 11, 1980, that sent Mike Palmateer and the 55th overall pick in exchange for Tim Coulis, Robert Picard and this pick.
 The Edmonton Oilers' second round pick went to the Montreal Canadiens as the result of to a trade on June 13, 1979, that sent Dave Lumley and Dan Newman to Edmonton in exchange for this pick.
 The Vancouver Canucks' second round pick went to the Chicago Black Hawks as the result of to a trade on June 16, 1978, that sent the rights to Thomas Gradin to Vancouver in exchange for this pick.
 The Pittsburgh Penguins' second round pick went to the Chicago Black Hawks as the result of to a trade on October 9, 1978, that sent Dale Tallon to Chicago in exchange for this pick.
 The Los Angeles Kings' second round pick went to the Calgary Flames as the result of to a trade on June 16, 1979, that sent Richard Mulhern and the 34th overall pick to Los Angeles in exchange for Bob Murdoch and this pick.
 The Toronto Maple Leafs' second round pick went to the Calgary Flames as the result of to a trade on June 10, 1980, that sent David Shand and the 55th overall pick to Toronto in exchange for this pick.
 The St. Louis Blues' second round pick went to the Los Angeles Kings as the result of to a trade on January 14, 1978, that sent Neil Komadoski to St. Louis in exchange for this pick.
 The Calgary Flames' second round pick went to the Los Angeles Kings as the result of to a trade on June 16, 1979, that sent Bob Murdoch and the 31st overall pick to Toronto in exchange for Richard Mulhern and this pick.
 The Boston Bruins' second round pick went to the Calgary Flames as the result of to a trade on June 2, 1980, that sent Jim Craig to Boston in exchange for the third round pick in 1981 and this pick.

Round three

Notes (Round 3)
1.* The Colorado Rockies' third round pick went to the Toronto Maple Leafs as the result of a trade on March 3, 1980, that sent Walt McKechnie to the Colorado Rockies in exchange for this pick.

2.* The Quebec Nordiques' third round pick went to the Montreal Canadiens as the result of a trade on June 9, 1979 that Quebec Nordiques promise to take Dan Geoffrion and/or Alain Cote, rather than Marc Tardif and/or Richard David in 1979 NHL Expansion Draft in exchange for the second round pick in 1981 and this pick.

3.* The Toronto Maple Leafs' third round pick went to the Minnesota North Stars as the result of to a trade on October 5, 1978, that sent Walt McKechnie to the Toronto Maple Leafs in exchange for this pick.

4.* The Toronto Maple Leafs' third round pick went to the Washington Capitals as the result of to a trade on June 11, 1980, that sent Tim Coulis, Robert Picard and 26th overall pick to the Toronto in exchange for Mike Palmateer and this pick.
Toronto had acquired the pick previously as the result of a trade on June 10, 1980, that sent 32nd overall pick to the Calgary Flames in exchange for Dave Shand and this pick.

5.* The New York Rangers' third round pick went to the Buffalo Sabres as the result of to a trade on March 12, 1979, that sent Jocelyn Guevremont to the New York Rangers in exchange for the third round pick in 1979 and this pick.

6.* The Minnesota North Stars' third round pick went to the Chicago Black Hawks as the result of to a trade on May 4, 1978, that sent the rights to Eddie Mio and future considerations (Pierre Plante) to the Minnesota North Stars in exchange for Doug Hicks and this pick.

Round four

Notes (Round 4)
1.* The Detroit Red Wings' fourth round pick went to the Chicago Black Hawks as the result of a trade on December 2, 1977, that sent Dennis Hull to the Detroit Red Wings in exchange for this pick.

2.* The Washington Capitals' fourth round pick went to the New York Islanders as the result of to a trade on December 7, 1979, that sent Mike Kaszycki to the Washington Capitals in exchange for Gord Lane and this pick.

Round five

Round six

Round seven

Notes (Round 7)
1.* The Pittsburgh Penguins' seventh round pick went to the Winnipeg Jets as the result of a trade on June 9, 1979, that Winnipeg Jets promised not to claim Kim Clackson as a priority selection in the 1979 NHL Expansion Draft in exchange for this pick.

Round eight

Round nine

Round ten

Notes (Round 10)
1.* The Edmonton Oilers' tenth round pick went to the Philadelphia Flyers as the result of a trade on June 11, 1980, that sent Barry Dean to the Edmonton Oilers in exchange for Ron Areshenkoff and this pick.

Draftees based on nationality

See also
 1980–81 NHL season
 List of NHL players

Notes

References

External links
 HockeyDraftCentral.com
 1980 NHL Entry Draft player stats at The Internet Hockey Database

National Hockey League Entry Draft
Draft